Laurel Dawson Munsell Libby is an American activist, Republican politician and interior designer from Maine. She is the representative for Maine House District 64, representing Minot and part of Auburn. Libby was a leader of the 2020 people's veto campaign opposing childhood vaccination laws in Maine and protested public health measures implemented to prevent the spread of COVID-19. She was elected to the Maine House in November 2020. Libby was one of seven conservative House Members to be stripped of their committee assignments over refusal to comply with mask mandates in the State House during the COVID-19 pandemic.

Early life and education
Libby was born in Bangor, Maine and grew up in a large family. She attended Roberts Wesleyan College where she studied nursing, was in the nursing honor society, and competed in women's cross country. She graduated with a Bachelor of Science in Nursing in 2003.

Libby worked as an ICU nurse at both Maine Medical Center and at St. Mary's Regional Medical Center and was a member of the MA-1 Medical Disaster Relief team, travelling to Puerto Rico in 2017 as part of the hurricane relief effort.

Activism

Anti-vaccine campaign
Libby opposed LD #798, Maine's 2019 law eliminating religious and philosophical exemptions for childhood vaccinations, and was a leader in the 2020 people's veto campaign to overturn it. She testified against the bill while it was in committee, describing an alleged reaction experienced by her son that was not treated or documented by a medical provider. Libby explained that she would not be further vaccinating him or two of her other children, and that if the law were to pass and eliminate religious and philosophical exemptions to school-required vaccinations, she and her family would be moving out of Maine.

When LD #798 passed, Libby canvassed for Mainers for Health and Parental Rights in the effort to get a people's veto of the new law on the statewide ballot in March 2020. The veto attempt failed 27%-73%.

Days after the referendum vote, Libby also testified in committee against LD #2117 "An Act To Expand and Rename the Controlled Substances Prescription Monitoring Program".

COVID-19 response
In December 2020, Libby published an opinion piece in the Lewiston Sun Journal opposing lockdowns in long-term care facilities during the COVID-19 pandemic in Maine. In January 2021, she was criticized along with another representative for wearing a "chin shield", rather than a face covering, while conducting business on the Maine State House property, where CDC-approved face coverings were mandatory COVID-19 precautions. The criticism prompted House leaders to clarify and reiterate which face coverings were acceptable for conducting State House duties. While most meetings and committee hearings of the 130th Maine legislature were held remotely during the pandemic, Libby participated from her seat on the House floor.

In August 2021, Libby spoke at an Augusta, Maine rally opposing a new statewide COVID-19 vaccination requirement for Maine healthcare employees, declaring "To be clear, this is war!". She encouraged healthcare employees to walk away from their jobs rather than become vaccinated.

Maine House
Libby announced her candidacy for Maine House District 64 in May 2020, challenging incumbent Bettyann Sheats. Her campaign was endorsed by the National Rifle Association, the Make Liberty Win PAC, and the Christian Civic League of Maine; and supported by the Don’t Tread on Maine PAC; the Women’s Leadership Fund; former Maine gubernatorial candidate Shawn Moody; Bruce Poliquin; and Susan Collins’ Dirigo PAC, as well as several fellow anti-vaccination activists from the 2020 people's veto campaign. Libby did not incorporate or mention her anti-vaccine activism while campaigning for the House.

Libby co-sponsored a bill proposed by Representative Heidi Sampson of Alfred seeking to enact the Stop Guilt by Accusation Act, a measure which requires media organizations to follow up on stories involving accused crimes. The bill has been proposed and defeated in several other U.S. states and was defeated in committee on May 5, 2021.

Libby served on the Judiciary committee from December 2020 until May 2021 when she and fellow representatives Heidi Sampson, Sherman Hutchins, Chris Johansen, Michael Lemelin, Jim Thorne, and John Andrews entered the Maine State House without required face coverings. The group was stopped by Capitol Police and asked to put on masks, but they refused to do so, requesting a meeting with the House Speaker Ryan Fecteau to clarify a ruling by the Legislative Council requiring the masks at the State House despite a statewide lift on the mask mandate. When the legislators' request for an audience with the Speaker was denied, they continued past capitol police and entered the State House. All seven lawmakers were relieved of their committee assignments effective May 25, 2021. Shortly after the incident, Libby posted a fundraising plea on her official Facebook page, drawing ire from Fecteau and some constituents.

Personal life
Libby is a Christian and attends East Auburn Baptist Church in Auburn. She enjoys running and design, and owns and operates Dawson Interiors, a decorating and real estate staging business.

She has been married to John Libby, a physical therapist, since 2005. The Libbys have five children.

Electoral record

References

External links
Laurel Libby official website
Representative Laurel Libby on Facebook
Dawson Interiors on Instagram

Living people
1981 births
21st-century American politicians
21st-century American women politicians
Republican Party members of the Maine House of Representatives
Politicians from Auburn, Maine
Women state legislators in Maine
Roberts Wesleyan University alumni
American anti-vaccination activists
American interior designers